The Imperial Court in Kyoto was the nominal ruling government of Japan from 794 AD until the Meiji period (1868–1912), after which the court was moved from Kyoto (formerly Heian-kyō) to Tokyo (formerly Edo) and integrated into the Meiji government. Upon the court being moved to Kyoto from Nagaoka by Emperor Kanmu (737-806), the struggles for power regarding the throne that had characterized the Nara period diminished. Kyoto was selected as the location for the court because of its "proper" amount of rivers and mountains which were believed to be the most auspicious surroundings for the new capital. The capital itself was built in imitation of Changan, closely following the theories of yin-yang. The most prominent group of people within the court was the civil aristocracy (kuge) which was the ruling class of society that exercised power on behalf of the emperor.

Kyoto's identity as a political, economic, and cultural centre started to be challenged in the post-1185 era with the rise of the shogunate system which gradually seized governance from the emperor. Minamoto no Yoritomo was the first to establish the post of the shōgun as hereditary, receiving the title in 1192. After Yoritomo launched the shogunate, true political power was in the hand of the shōguns, who were mistaken several times for the Emperors of Japan by representatives of Western countries. The Kamakura Shogunate (or Kamakura Bafuku) would go on to last for almost 150 years, from 1185 to 1333.

See also
Five regent houses
Heian Palace
Kyoto Gosho

References

Further reading

 Ackroyd, Joyce. (1982). [ Arai Hakuseki, 1712] Tokushi Yoron; "Lessons from History: the Tokushi yoron" translated by Joynce Ackroyd. Brisbane: University of Queensland Press. 
  Asai T. (1985). Nyokan Tūkai. Tokyo: Kōdansha.
 Brown, Delmer and Ichiro Ishida, eds. (1979). [ Jien, c. 1220],  Gukanshō; "The Future and the Past: a translation and study of the 'Gukanshō', an interpretive history of Japan written in 1219" translated from the Japanese and edited by Delmer M. Brown & Ichirō Ishida. Berkeley: University of California Press.  
 Ozaki, Yukio. (2001). The Autobiography of Ozaki Yukio: The Struggle for Constitutional Government in Japan. [Translated by Fujiko Hara]. Princeton: Princeton University Press.  (cloth)
  Ozaki, Yukio. (1955). Ozak Gakudō Zenshū. Tokyo: Kōronsha.
 Sansom, George (1958). A History of Japan to 1334. Stanford: Stanford University Press. 
 Sansom, George. (1952). Japan: A Short Cultural History. Stanford: Stanford University Press.   (cloth)  (paper)
 Screech, Timon. (2006). Secret Memoirs of the Shoguns:  Isaac Titsingh and Japan, 1779–1822. London: RoutledgeCurzon. 
 Titsingh, Isaac. (1834). [Siyun-sai Rin-siyo/Hayashi Gahō, 1652], Nipon o daï itsi ran; ou, Annales des empereurs du Japon, tr. par M. Isaac Titsingh avec l'aide de plusieurs interprètes attachés au comptoir hollandais de Nangasaki; ouvrage re., complété et cor. sur l'original japonais-chinois, accompagné de notes et précédé d'un Aperçu d'histoire mythologique du Japon, par M. J. Klaproth.  Paris: Oriental Translation Fund of Great Britain and Ireland....Click link to digitized, full-text copy of this book (in French)
 Ury, Marian.  (1999). "Chinese Learning and Intellectual Life", The Cambridge history of Japan: Heian Japan. Vol. II. Cambridge: Cambridge University Press.  (cloth)
 Varley, H. Paul, ed. (1980). [ Kitabatake Chikafusa, 1359], Jinnō Shōtōki ("A Chronicle of Gods and Sovereigns: Jinnō Shōtōki of Kitabatake Chikafusa" translated by H. Paul Varley). New York: Columbia University Press.  

Japanese monarchy
Royal and noble courts
Former capitals of Japan
History of Kyoto

ja:京都御所